Daniel "Dani" Martín Fernández (born 8 July 1998) is a Spanish professional footballer who plays as a goalkeeper for Real Betis.

Club career
Born in Gijón, Asturias, Martín represented Sporting de Gijón as a youth. Promoted to the reserves ahead of the 2016–17 season, he made his senior debut on 21 August 2016 by starting in a 7–0 Tercera División home routing of UC Ceares.

Martín made his first-team debut on 19 September 2017, starting and making several key stops which included a penalty kick, in a 1–1 home draw against CD Numancia, for the season's Copa del Rey (1–3 loss on penalties). Late in the month, he extended his contract until 2021 and being definitely promoted to the main squad for the following campaign.

Martín made his league debut at RCD Mallorca, replacing injured Diego Mariño in a match were Sporting was defeated by 1–2 in extra time. He contributed with four league appearances during the campaign, acting mainly as a backup to Mariño.

On 18 July 2019, Martín joined La Liga side Real Betis on a five-year deal. He made his debut in the Spanish top tier on 18 August, coming on as a first-half substitute for field player Joaquín in a 1–2 home loss against Real Valladolid, after Joel Robles was sent off.

Martín was mainly a backup to Joel during his first season, where he featured in eight matches overall, but was demoted to third-choice in his second after the arrival of Claudio Bravo. On 30 July 2021, after falling down further in the pecking order due to the arrival of Rui Silva, he moved to Málaga CF in the second division on a one-year loan deal.

Career statistics

Club

Honours
Spain U21
UEFA European Under-21 Championship: 2019

References

External links
Profile at the Real Betis website

1998 births
Living people
People from Gijón
Spanish footballers
Footballers from Asturias
Association football goalkeepers
La Liga players
Segunda División B players
Tercera División players
Sporting de Gijón B players
Sporting de Gijón players
Real Betis players
Málaga CF players
Spain youth international footballers
Spain under-21 international footballers